Qaleh Kol (also Romanized as Qal‘eh Kol) is a town in Gasht Rural District, in the Central District of Fuman County, Gilan Province, Iran. At the 2006 census, its population was 480, in 121 families.

References 

Populated places in Fuman County